M. P. Radhakrishnan was an Indian career banker who served as the eighteenth Chairman of State Bank of India.

Career 

He joined the State Bank of India as a probationary officer in September 1964 and served in a number of roles until finally becoming the Chairman of State Bank of India in 1998.

He served as the eighteenth Chairman of State Bank of India from 01 December 1998 until 31 January 1999. He was succeeded by G. G. Vaidya after his retirement in 1999.

Controversies 

In 2007, he was chargesheeted by India's Central Bureau of Investigation for allegedly siphoning off funds worth Rs 5 crore to acquire the Indira Gandhi College for Women. The fraud involved the St Johns Road branch of State Bank of India in Secunderabad. He forged several signatures and fraudulently obtained loans and overdrafts to the tune of Rs 5 crore.<ref name="indiatimes1"/
>

in fact  it is one Y Radhakrishnan who was Managing Director of State Bank of India who was involved in this controversy.

References

External links 

 Official Biography
 SBI chairmen
 SBI history

Indian bankers
State Bank of India
Chairmen of the State Bank of India